National Security Law may refer to:
National Security Law of the United States
National Security Law of the People's Republic of China
Macau national security law
Hong Kong national security law
National Security Law (Brazil)

See also
National Security Act (disambiguation)
NSL (disambiguation)